Conodon is a genus of grunts native to the Pacific and Atlantic coasts of the Americas.
The currently recognized species in this genus are:
 Conodon macrops Hildebrand, 1946 (lemoneye grunt)
 Conodon nobilis (Linnaeus, 1758) (barred grunt)
 Conodon serrifer D. S. Jordan & C. H. Gilbert, 1882 (armed grunt)

References

Haemulinae
Taxa named by Georges Cuvier